Lišany is a municipality and village in Rakovník District in the Central Bohemian Region of the Czech Republic. It has about 700 inhabitants.

References

External links

 (in Czech)

Villages in Rakovník District